The 2010–11 Ligakupa was the fourth edition of the Hungarian League Cup, the Ligakupa.

First group stage

Quarterfinals
The matches will be played on 19 February and 9 March 2011.

Semifinals
The matches were played on 26, 27 and 30 March 2011.

Finals
April 6 and 13, 2011.

External links
 soccerway.com

NemII
2010–11 domestic association football cups
2010-11